Tour 2003 is a live and video album by Ringo Starr & His All-Starr Band released in 2004.

Overview
After releasing Ringo Rama in 2003, Starr embarked on tour once more with his All-Starr Band and its ever-changing collective of musicians. From the previous band remained Mark Rivera, as does singing percussionist Sheila E.  New to the mix are Paul Carrack of Squeeze and Mike + The Mechanics fame, Colin Hay from Australian band Men at Work and John Waite, a solo artist who also had fronted The Babys and Bad English.

The performance included on the album is from the opening night of his Ringo Starr and his All Starr Band Tour 2003: Ringo Rama tour at the Casino Rama, just outside Toronto, Ontario in Canada. Despite this, the CD booklet for Tour 2003 confusingly carries a review for a later August show in Detroit.

Having already exhausted the appearances of most of his 1960s and 1970s contemporaries, Starr's new participants clearly add a strong 1980s element to Tour 2003, giving this recording a different edge.  While Starr typically performs his well-known hits from his heyday, he does venture here to include "Memphis In Your Mind" from Ringo Rama

Reception
Some critics were quick to note that this live album was Starr's seventh official release of the sort in fourteen years. Tour 2003 generally received lackluster reviews upon release.  The release failed to chart.

Track listing

Personnel 

 Ringo Starr – vocals, drums, piano (instruments uncredited)
 Colin Hay – guitar, vocals
 Paul Carrack – keyboards, vocals
 John Waite – bass, vocals, guitar
 Sheila E. – drums, vocals, percussion
 Mark Rivera – saxophone, percussion, backing vocals, flute, bass, harmonica

References

External links
 Koch Records album website 

2004 live albums
Ringo Starr live albums